Steinbach is a commune in the Haut-Rhin department, administrative region of Grand Est (formerly Alsace), northeastern France.

See also
 Communes of the Haut-Rhin department

References

Communes of Haut-Rhin